Kata Khat is a village and union council in Mardan District of Khyber Pakhtunkhwa.

References

Union councils of Mardan District
Populated places in Mardan District